"Carolyn" is a song written by Tommy Collins, and recorded by American country music artist Merle Haggard and The Strangers.  It was released in November 1971 as the second single from the album Someday We'll Look Back.  The song was Haggard and The Strangers eleventh number one on the U.S. country singles chart. The single stayed at number one for three weeks and spent a total of fifteen weeks on the chart.

Chart performance

References

1971 singles
1971 songs
Merle Haggard songs
Songs written by Tommy Collins (singer)
Song recordings produced by Ken Nelson (American record producer)
Capitol Records singles